George Tsakopoulos (July 7, 1927– June 15, 2009) was a prominent real estate developer and co-founder of Tsakopoulos Investments in Sacramento, California.  Among his more recent and noteworthy accomplishments were the development of the 25 story skyscraper at 500 Capitol Mall in Sacramento, which was completed in May 2009 as well as the naming of his company as Sacramento "Developer of the Year" for 2008.  Tsakopoulos, who was born in Rizes, Greece, and was wounded in the Greek Civil War, arrived in United States in 1955. George's younger brother, Angelo Tsakopoulos, founded Sacramento's AKT Development Inc. George would also become a major investor with his younger brother in Sacramento real estate with his company, Tsakopoulos Investments. Tsakopoulos died at the age of 81 in Sacramento, California.

References 

Businesspeople from California
Greek emigrants to the United States
American real estate businesspeople
1927 births
2009 deaths
20th-century American businesspeople